The Ketua Menteri Sabah or Chief Minister of Sabah is the head of government of the Malaysian state of Sabah. Since September 2020, the position has been held by Hajiji Noor from the Parti Gagasan Rakyat Sabah (Gagasan Rakyat) from the coalition of Gabungan Rakyat Sabah (GRS) which had won the 2020 Sabah state election. As in other parts of the Malaysian federation, the Westminster Parliamentary system is adopted, whereby, the leader of the party with the most seats in the state legislature would usually become the chief minister of Sabah. In other words, it is the person commanding the support of the state legislature. The chief minister is appointed by the head of state known as the Yang di-Pertua Negeri. In comparison to other states in Malaysia, the office of the Chief Minister of Sabah has been held by a more diverse group of people in terms of ethnicity and religion. The post has been held by Kadazan-Dusuns, Bajaus, Malays, Chinese, Muruts, Rungus, Sungai, Idaans, and other persons of mixed heritage as well as being Muslims, Buddhists and Christians.

Rotation system: 1994–2004 
The rotation system was used in the state of Sabah as a means to divide and share power among the three main communities of the state—the Christian Bumiputras, the Muslim Bumiputras, and the Chinese people—represented by various political parties within the Barisan National coalition supposedly representing the interests of those communities. The system was introduced by the then Prime Minister of Malaysia Mahathir Mohamad when the ruling coalition party, Barisan Nasional, formed government despite losing in the 1994 state elections. This occurred due to defections which took place by elected representatives of Parti Bersatu Sabah (PBS), the party which won the election. Among the defectors were Bernard Dompok, who later became the chief minister himself and Joseph Kurup.

The system provided that the chief ministerial post will be held by a leader from one of the three communities for two years, and then the post will be passed on to another leader representing another community. The first chief minister under this system was Sakaran Dandai from the party United Malays National Organisation (UMNO) in 1994. Sakaran did not complete his two-year tenure and was replaced by Salleh Said Keruak, also from UMNO. In 1996, Yong Teck Lee from Sabah Progressive Party (SAPP) became next chief minister.  Bernard Dompok then became the next chief minister representing the Christian Bumiputra community in 1998. His tenure lasted until 1999.

Appointment 
Source: Constitution of the State of Sabah
According to the state constitution, the Yang di-Pertua Negeri of Sabah shall first appoint the Chief Minister to preside over the Cabinet and requires such Chief Minister to be a member of the Legislative Assembly who in his judgment is likely to command the confidence of the majority of the members of the Assembly and must not a Malaysian citizen by naturalisation or by registration. The Yang di-Pertua Negeri on the Chief Minister's advice shall appoint not more than ten nor less than four Ministers from among the members of the Legislative Assembly.

The Chief Minister and his cabinet ministers must take and subscribe in the presence of the Yang di-Pertua Negeri the oath of office and allegiance as well as the oath of secrecy before they can exercise the functions of office. The Cabinet shall be collectively responsible to the Legislative Assembly. The members of the Cabinet shall not hold any office of profit and engage in any trade, business or profession that will cause conflict of interest.

If a government cannot get its appropriation (budget) legislation passed by the Legislative Assembly, or the Legislative Assembly passes a vote of "no confidence" in the government, the Chief Minister is bound by convention to resign immediately. The Yang di-Pertua Negeri's choice of replacement chief minister will be dictated by the circumstances. Ministers other than the Chief Minister shall hold office during the pleasure of the Yang di-Pertua Negeri, unless the appointment of any Minister shall have been revoked by the Yang di-Pertua Negeri on the advice of the Chief Minister but may at any time resign his office.

Following a resignation in other circumstances, defeated in an election or the death of a chief minister, the Yang di-Pertua Negeri will generally appoint as Chief Minister the person voted by the governing party as their new leader.

Powers 
The power of the chief minister is subject to a number of limitations. Chief ministers removed as leader of his or her party, or whose government loses a vote of no confidence in the Legislative Assembly, must advise a state election or resign the office or be dismissed by the Yang di-Pertua Negeri. The defeat of a supply bill (one that concerns the spending of money) or unable to pass important policy-related legislation is seen to require the resignation of the government or dissolution of Legislative Assembly, much like a non-confidence vote, since a government that cannot spend money is hamstrung, also called loss of supply.

The chief minister's party will normally have a majority in the Legislative Assembly and party discipline is exceptionally strong in Sabahan politics, so passage of the government's legislation through the Legislative Assembly is mostly a formality.

Caretaker Chief Minister 
The legislative assembly unless sooner dissolved by the Yang di-Pertua Negeri with His Excellency's own discretion on the advice of the chief minister shall continue for five years from the date of its first meeting. The state constitution permits a delay of 90 days of general election to be held from the date of dissolution and the legislative assembly shall be summoned to meet on a date not later than 120 days from the date of dissolution. Conventionally, between the dissolution of one legislative assembly and the convening of the next, the chief minister and the cabinet remain in office in a caretaker capacity.

List of chief ministers of Sabah 
The following is the list of Chief Ministers of Sabah since 1963:

Colour key (for political parties):

See also 
 Governor of North Borneo

Notes

References